BLIXT is a collaborative album by Morgan Ågren, Raoul Björkenheim and Bill Laswell. It was released on October 11, 2011 by Cuneiform Records.

Track listing

Personnel 
Adapted from the BLIXT liner notes.
Musicians
Morgan Ågren – drums
Raoul Björkenheim – guitar, design
Bill Laswell – bass guitar
Technical personnel
Stefan Bremer – cover art
James Dellatacoma – assistant engineering
Michael Fossenkemper – mastering
Robert Musso – recording, mixing

Release history

References

External links 
 Blixt at Discogs (list of releases)
 Blixt at Bandcamp

2011 albums
Collaborative albums
Bill Laswell albums
Cuneiform Records albums